The tetzilacatl was an Mexica percussion instrument. This vibrator or resonator, was a tray of copper suspended by a cord, which was struck with sticks or with the hand. It appears to have been principally confined to the sacred music in the temples.

References
 
  
  
 

North American percussion instruments
Mesoamerican musical instruments
Mexican musical instruments
Idiophones